At the 1900 Summer Olympics one gymnastics event for men was contested. The competition was held on Sunday, 29 July 1900, and on Monday, 30 July 1900. There were 135 competitors from 8 nations. The top 18 places were taken by French gymnasts, of which there were more than 100. The event was won by Gustave Sandras, with Noël Bas finishing second and Lucien Démanet third. The highest-placing foreign gymnast was Jules Ducret of Switzerland, in a tie for 19th place.

Medal summary

Background

This was the first appearance of an all-around event. There had been various apparatus events at the 1896 Games, but no overall competition. In contrast, the 1900 Games saw only the all-around event without medals or separate events for any individual apparatus. At the time, athletics events were often combined with gymnastics events in combined events such as this one.

The Swiss championships were scheduled for a week after this competition, resulting in few Swiss gymnasts competing here.

Competition format

Gymnasts performed in 16 exercises, many of them being two competitions of the same discipline with one compulsory exercise and one voluntary exercise. There was a maximum of 20 points in each exercise, leading to a total maximum of 320 points. The events were mostly gymnastic in nature, but also included a number of athletics events and a weightlifting competition.

 1. and 2. - Horizontal bar (compulsory and optional exercises)
 3. and 4. - Parallel bars (compulsory and optional exercises)
 5. and 6. - Rings (compulsory and optional exercises)
 7. and 8. - Pommel horse (compulsory and optional exercises)
 9. and 10. - Floor exercise (compulsory and optional exercises)
 11. - Horse vault (compulsory exercise)
 12. - Combined high jump
 13. - Long jump
 14. - Pole vault
 15. - Rope climbing
 16. - Weightlifting

The combined high jump required a jump over a rope that was 1.25 metres above the ground and 1 metre away from the take-off. The scoring standard for the long jump was 5 metres; for the pole vault, 2.2 metres. The rope climbing featured a rope of 6 metres. The weightlifting used a 50 kilograms weight, with 2 points for each overhead lift up to 10 lifts.

Schedule

Results

Participating nations
A total of 135 gymnasts from 8 nations competed at the Paris Games:

Medal table

References

External links
 International Olympic Committee medal winners database
 De Wael, Herman. Herman's Full Olympians: "Gymnastics 1900". Accessed 25 February 2006.
 

 
1900 Summer Olympics events
1900
Gymnastics in Paris
International gymnastics competitions hosted by France
1900 in gymnastics